Zaliabad Yarnazir (also Romanized as Zālīābād Yārnaẓir; also known as Zālīābād) is a village in Mirbag-e Shomali Rural District, in the Central District of Delfan County, Lorestan Province, Iran. At the 2006 census, its population was 739, in 151 families.

References 

Towns and villages in Delfan County